Olympia Medical Center (OMC) was a hospital in Los Angeles, California.

History
Founded in 1948 as Midway Hospital Medical Center, the hospital has undergone several owners.  In 1993, Summit Health Ltd. sold the hospital to OrNda HealthCorp.  It was then purchased by Tenet Healthcare in 1997.  The hospital was renamed in April 2005 when Tenet sold it to Physicians of Midway, Inc.  The new name is drawn from the fact that the building is located on Olympic Blvd.  As of December 31, 2013, Alecto Healthcare took ownership of and began managing Olympia Medical Center's operations.

External links
Official Website
This hospital in the CA Healthcare Atlas A project by OSHPD

References

Hospital buildings completed in 1948
Hospitals in Los Angeles
Mid-Wilshire, Los Angeles